Grasse (Provençal  in classical norm or  in Mistralian norm ; traditional ) is the only subprefecture of the Alpes-Maritimes department in the Provence-Alpes-Côte-d'Azur region on the French Riviera. In 2017, the commune had a population of 50,396.

Considered the world's capital of perfume, Grasse obtained two flowers in the Concours des villes et villages fleuris and was made Ville d'Art et d'Histoire (City of Art and History).

Festivals
There is an annual Fête du Jasmin or La Jasminade, at the beginning of August. The first festival was on August 3–4, 1946. Decorated floats drive through the town, with young women in skimpy costumes on board, throwing flowers into the crowd. Garlands of jasmine decorate the town center, and the fire department fills a fire truck with jasmine-infused water to spray on the crowds. There are also fireworks, free parties, folk music groups and street performers. There is also an annual international exhibition of roses ("Expo Rose") held in May each year.

Transport
The Gare de Grasse railway station offers connections with Cannes, Nice and Ventimiglia.  From 1909 until 1938, the town centre was connected to the railway station by the Grasse Funicular.

Perfume

Grasse has had a prospering perfume industry since the end of the 18th century. Grasse is the centre of the French perfume industry and is known as the world's perfume capital (la capitale mondiale des parfums). Many "noses" (or, in French, "Les nez" (plural)/"Le nez" (singular)) are trained or have spent time in Grasse to distinguish over 2,000 kinds of scent. Grasse produces over two-thirds of France's natural aromas (for perfume and for food flavourings). This industry turns over more than 600 million euros a year. Grasse's particular microclimate encouraged the flower farming industry. It is warm and sufficiently inland to be sheltered from the sea air. There is an abundance of water, thanks to its location in the hills and the 1860 construction of the Siagne canal for irrigation purposes. Jasmine, a key ingredient of many perfumes, was brought to southern France by the Moors in the 16th century. Twenty-seven tonnes of jasmine are now harvested in Grasse annually. There are numerous old 'parfumeries' in Grasse, such as Galimard, Molinard and Fragonard, each with tours and a museum.

The trade in leather and tanning work developed during the twelfth century around the small canal that runs through the city. This activity produced a strong unpleasant odor. At the time of the Renaissance perfume manufacturers began production of gloves, handbags and belt (clothing), to meet the new fashion from Italy with the entourage of Queen Catherine de Medici.

The countryside around the city began to grow fields of flowers, offering new scents from the city. In 1614, the king recognized the new corporation of "glovers perfumers".
In the middle of the eighteenth century, the perfumery was experiencing a very important development. Leading companies dating from this period includes the oldest French perfumerie, and third oldest parfumerie in Europe, Galimard established in 1747. Introduction of new production methods turned perfume making into a real industry that could adapt to new market demands.

In the nineteenth century, the raw materials began to be imported from abroad. During the twentieth century the creation of synthetic products brought the democratization & affordability of perfumes and their spin-offs; (shampoos and deodorants, cream (pharmaceutical) and detergents, food flavoring for cookies, ice cream and dairy products, beverages, convenience foods, confectionery, preserves and syrups).
In 1905, six hundred tons of flowers were harvested while in the 1940s, five thousand tons were produced annually. However, in early 2000, production was less than 30 tons for all flowers combined.

Historical activity
In the Middle Ages, Grasse specialized in leather tanning. Once tanned, the hides were often exported to Genoa or Pisa, cities that shared a commercial alliance with Grasse. Several centuries of this intense activity witnessed many technological advances within tanning industries. The hides of Grasse acquired a reputation for high quality. But the leather smelled badly, something that did not please the glove wearing nobility. This is when Jean de Galimard, a tanner in Grasse, came up with the idea of scented leather gloves. He offered a pair of scented gloves to Catherine de Medici, who was seduced by the gift. Thereafter, the product spread through the Royal Court and high society, and this made a worldwide reputation for Grasse. The seventeenth century became the heyday of "Glovers Perfumers'; however, high taxes on leather and competition from Nice brought a decline for the leather industry in Grasse, and production of leather fragrance ceased. The rare scents from the Grasse (lavender, myrtle, jasmine, rose, orange blossom and wild mimosa) did win the title for the Grasse as the perfume capital of the world. Harvesting jasmine was a labor-intensive business only a few decades ago. Flowers had to be hand picked at dawn, when their scent is the most developed and immediately to be treated by cold enfleurage.

Modern industry

A network of sixty companies employs 3,500 people in the city and surrounding area. Additionally about 10,000 residents of Grasse are indirectly employed by the perfume industry. Almost half of the business tax for the city comes from the perfume sector and that is ahead of tourism and services. The main activity of perfumery in Grasse is in the production of natural raw materials (essential oils, concretes, absolutes, resinoids and molecular distillation) and the production of concentrate, also called the juice. A concentrate is the main product that when diluted in at least 80% alcohol provides a perfume. Also food flavorings, which developed since the 1970s, account for over half of production output today.

This represents almost half of the production of French perfumes and aromas and around 7-8% of total global activity. However, during the 1960s and 1970s large international groups gradually bought up local family factories (Chiris, Givaudan-Roure and Lautier, for example). Soon after their production has often been relocated overseas. Just 30 years ago most companies were focused on the production of raw materials. However an overwhelming majority of the modern fragrances contain synthetic chemicals in part or in whole. Grasse perfume companies have therefore adapted by turning to aromatic synthesis and especially to food flavorings and successfully ended a long stagnation. The Grasse perfume industry cannot compete against large chemical multinationals, but it benefits greatly from the advantage of its knowledge of raw materials, facilities, contractors, etc. In addition, major brands such as Dior and Chanel have their own plantations of roses and jasmine in the vicinity of Grasse.

Perfumeries
Three perfumeries, Fragonard, Molinard and Galimard opened their doors to the public and offer free tours that explain the processes of producing a perfume. It is possible to create one's own perfume, eau de perfume or eau de toilette and participate in all stages of manufacture from picking flowers to bottling.

 Galimard Perfumery, established in 1747 by Jean de Galimard, provided the Royal Court with ointments and perfumes. It is the third oldest perfume company in the world after Farina gegenüber and Floris of London and was revived after the war by Gaston de Fontmichel and Joseph Roux.
 Molinard was established in 1849 and their perfume bottles were made of Baccarat crystal and Lalique glass. Clients can create their own personalized perfume during the Tarinology fragrance course workshop.
 The Fragonard Perfumery was established in 1926 in one of the oldest factories in the city. Its museum Fragonard Musée du Parfum displays rare objects that explain the history of perfumery, covering 5,000 years.
 International Perfume Museum. Opened in 1989, the museum traces the evolution of techniques during the 5,000 year history of perfumery and the large contribution of the Grasse area to perfume making. It was renovated and expanded (doubling in size) between 2007 and 2008.
 Perfume Art Creation, perfumed art-producing company combining authentic fragrances from Grasse, and an art gallery based in Zollikerberg, Switzerland. Its fragrance-infused artworks and paintings are the copyright concept of Perfume Art Creation, which allows the viewer visually to explore the artwork, to smell it, allowing for holistic stimulation of the senses. Working and creating commonly with the artists, the paintings are infused with the preferred collector’s perfume and scent, and his or her individual or corporate fragrance is introduced into the art.

Population

Religion
The town is home to Grasse Cathedral, the seat of the Roman Catholic former Diocese of Grasse which was led by the Bishops of Grasse.

Education
The town is home to the Lycée Amiral-de-Grasse and since 2019 one of two seats of the higher education engineering college ECAM-EPMI.

Sport
RC Grasse is the local football club, whereas RO Grasse the local rugby union club.

In popular culture
The town is the setting in the final chapters of the novel Perfume by Patrick Süskind. It was featured in the film based on the novel Perfume: The Story of a Murderer (2006).

Main sights
Three perfume factories offer daily tours and demonstrations, which draw in many of the region's visitors. In addition to the perfumeries, Grasse's other main attraction is the Cathedral, dedicated to Notre Dame du Puy and founded in the 11th century. In the interior, are three works by Rubens and one by Jean-Honoré Fragonard, the French painter native of the town.

Other sights include:
 Saracen Tower, standing at 30m.
 Monumental gate of the Hôtel de ville
 International Museum of Perfume
 Musée d'Art et d'Histoire de Provence
 Church of Plascassier, built in 1644

Notable people

Grasse was the birthplace of:
 Louis Bellaud (1543–1588), also known as Bellaud de la Bellaudière, poet
 Mélanie Bernier (born 1985), actress
 Frédéric Bourdillon (born 1991), French-Israeli basketball player in the Israel Basketball Premier League
 Jacques Cavallier (born 1962), perfumer 
 Albert Charpin (1842–1924), painter
 Olivier Cresp (born 1955), perfumer
 Jean-Claude Ellena (born 1947), perfumer
 Alexandre-Évariste Fragonard (1780-1850), painter and sculptor
 Jean-Honoré Fragonard (1732–1806), painter
 Jean Claude Gandur (born 1949), businessman
 Valentine Goby (born 1974), writer
 Marcel Journet (1868–1933), operatic baritone
 Vincent Koziello (born 1995), footballer
 Gilles Marini (born 1976), actor
 Michèle Mouton (born 1951), rally driver
 Charles Pasqua (1927-2015), businessman and politician
 Gazan de la Peyrière (1765-1845), general during the Napoleonic Wars
 Eugénie Le Sommer (born 1989), woman footballer
 Thomas Pinault (born 1981), footballer
 Adam Bessa, (born 1992), actor
 Théo Pourchaire (born 2003), racing driver

Grasse was the death place of:
 Christian Calmes, Luxembourgian civil servant, lawyer, and historian 
 Prince Eugen of Bavaria, member of the Bavarian Royal House of Wittelsbach
 Lolo Ferrari, dancer, actress, and singer
 Édith Piaf, singer
 Yvonne Rozille (1900–1985), film actress
 Eugène Sémérie (1832–1884), positivist activist
Also notable:
 Ivan Bunin, Russian writer, Nobel Prize in Literature, 1933
 François Joseph Paul de Grasse (1723–1788) admiral, best known for his command of the French fleet at the Battle of the Chesapeake, which led directly to the British surrender at Yorktown
 Gérard Philipe, actor
 Frederic Prokosch, American writer
 Alice Charlotte von Rothschild, patron of the arts
 H. G. Wells, British writer
 Dirk Bogarde, actor

Twin towns - sister cities

Grasse is twinned with:

 Ingolstadt, Germany since 1963
 Carrara, Italy since 1995
 Vila Real, Portugal since 1975
 Murcia, Spain since 1990
 Marblehead, Massachusetts USA since 1986
 Opole, Poland since 1964
 Kazanlak, Bulgaria
 Pardes Hanna-Karkur, Israel

See also
 Route Napoléon
 Ancient Diocese of Grasse
 Communes of the Alpes-Maritimes department

References

External links

 Grasse city council website (in French)
 

 
Communes of Alpes-Maritimes
French Riviera
Subprefectures in France